Miss World Kosova  (Miss World Kosovo) is a national beauty pageant that sends representatives from Kosovo to the Miss World pageant. This pageant is not related to Miss Universe Kosovo pageant.

History
On 4 April 2008, Fadil Berisha - photographer of Miss Universe’s official photos - hosted Kosovo's inaugural pageant where Zana Krasniqi was crowned. She went on represent Kosovo at the Miss Universe pageant. This was the first appearance in a Miss Universe pageant for Miss Kosovo following the country's declaration of independence on February 17, 2008.

In 2013 Fadil Berisha and Agnesa Vutaj took control of Miss Kosovo and retrieved the Miss Universe franchise. This happened after the previous Miss Universe Kosovo director, Agron Selimi and team made the decision to send their winner to Miss World. Thus, winners for Miss Earth and Miss Universe pageant is being held under single pageant.

Nowadays Miss World Kosova has only sent its winner to the Miss World pageant.

Titleholders

Miss World Kosova
Color key

See also
Miss Kosovo
Miss Universe Kosovo

References

Beauty pageants in Kosovo
Recurring events established in 2013
Kosovan awards